Paul Dubreil (1 March 1904 – 9 March 1994) was a French mathematician.

He was born in Le Mans, Maine, France and died in Soisy-sur-École, France.  Dubreil was married to fellow mathematician Marie-Louise Dubreil-Jacotin.

Selected publications

Articles

Books
  (preface by Gaston Julia)
 
 with M.L. Dubreil-Jacotin: 
  (English translation)
   (Spanish translation by R. Rodriguez Vidal)

References

External links

20th-century French mathematicians
1904 births
1994 deaths
École Normale Supérieure alumni
Academic staff of the University of Lille Nord de France